USS Ulysses may refer to:
, a United States Navy-designed collier built under U.S. Navy supervision for the Panama Canal Company in 1914; never commissioned in the United States Navy; converted to a tanker in 1930; renamed San Blas in 1942; burned and sank at La Plata in 1944
, an  built in 1944; converted to a battle damage repair ship; decommissioned in 1946; transferred to West Germany in 1961; final fate unknown

See also

 for Royal Navy vessels
 for motor vessels named Ulysses
 for steamships named Ulysses

United States Navy ship names